Tiny Pop (styled as tiny POP) is a British free-to-air children's television channel in the United Kingdom, owned by Narrative Entertainment UK Limited. Broadcast on many of the major digital television platforms in the UK, Tiny Pop, which was launched on 8 September 2003 as Pop Plus, and shows, its target audience is children aged 7 and under. The station broadcasts principally animated content sourced from various distributors.

History

As Pop Plus
The channel began on 8 September 2003 as Pop Plus (stylized on-screen as p⊕p), a secondary service to Pop. The channel was licensed to air animation and music, it operated the same broadcast hours as its sister channel (6am to 8pm at the time; Pop later expanded to its current 24-hour service) and was not a direct timeshift of its sibling, instead offering an alternative mix of the channel's content. (At one point the arrangement was that whilst Pop was showing music Pop Plus would show cartoons, and vice versa, but this was not always the case).

As Tiny Pop
On 27 July 2004, it was relaunched as Tiny Pop, which allowed the main Pop to refocus on slightly older children and reduce its use of preschooler shows.

As with other CSC channels, on-screen presenters are rarely used: programmes are introduced either by caption and voiceover alone, or  through animated characters. For a time during the mid-2000s (decade), a group of animated monkeys, known as the Cheeky Monkeys, would talk about cartoons, read out jokes from viewers and show artwork; from the end of June 2009, they were replaced with three new hosts, Molly, Leo and Pip (who are also monkeys).

Tiny Pop initially broadcast on satellite TV – Sky (channel 615) from the channel's launch, and Freesat (channel 605) from the launch of the platform in 2008.

On 11 October 2007, Tiny Pop was launched on Virgin Media, along with its sister channel Pop. Pop was removed in 2011, but was brought back on 25 August 2016. The station has also been made available over other cable systems.

On 14 July 2016, Tiny Pop +1 was temporarily replaced by Pop Max. The channel aired back-to-back episodes of a show from Pop. Tiny Pop +1 returned on 1 December 2016. The channel ran a second time from 9 February 2017 to 25 April 2017.

On 3 September 2018, Tiny Pop unveiled a new logo after seven years in use.

Sky channel moves
 As part of the major EPG reshuffle on 1 May 2018, Tiny Pop +1 moved from 625 to 624.

 On 11 January 2021, Tiny Pop moved from 617 to 615, RTÉjr moved from 623 to 617 on Ireland.

 On 11 January 2021, Tiny Pop +1 moved from 624 to 618, RTÉjr moved from 630 to 624 on Northern Ireland.

Availability

Cable
Virgin Media : Channel 737 (SD)

Online
FilmOn : Watch live
Virgin TV Anywhere : VirginMedia.com

Satellite
Freesat : Channel 605 (SD) and Manual (+1)
Sky  and Sky : Channel 615 (SD) and Channel 618 (+1)

Terrestrial
Freeview : Channel 207 (SD) and Channel 208 (Pop Player)

Programming

Current programming 
 Agent Binky: Pets of the Universe
 Apollo's Tall Tales
 Arpo
 Barbie Dreamtopia
 Blippi
 Care Bears: Unlock the Magic (2019–present, also on Pop and Sky Kids)
 Cocomelon
 Cookie Monster's Foodie Truck
 Dino Ranch
 DinoCity
 Dinotrux (2017–Present) 
 Enchantimals: Tales from Everwilde
 Ella, Oscar & Hoo
 Elmo and Tango's Mysterious Mysteries
 Elmo's World 
 Esme & Roy
 Gabby's Dollhouse
 Gigantosaurus (2020–present)
 Gus – The Itsy Bitsy Knight
 Lilybuds
 Little Bear (English dub of Pompon Ours)
 Masha and the Bear (Also on Cartoonito)
 Mighty Express (2022–present)
 Molang (2018–present)
 Monchhichi Tribe
Morphle
Mush-Mush and the Mushables  
 My Little Pony: Pony Life (2020–present)
 The Ollie & Moon Show
 Petronix Defenders (2022–present)
 Pikwik Pack
 PJ Masks (2017–present)
 Remy & Boo
 Rev & Roll
 Simon
 Smart Cookies
 Strawberry Shortcake: Berry in the Big City (2022–present)
 Super Wings (2017–Present) 
 Transformers: Rescue Bots Academy
 Trolls: The Beat Goes On! (also on Pop)
True and the Rainbow Kingdom(2020–present)
 Yeti Tales

Upcoming programming
 Billy, The Cowboy Hamster

Former programming 
 The Adventures of Paddington Bear
 Aesop's Theatre
 Ava Riko Teo
 The Babaloos
 Babar
 Babar and the Adventures of Badou
 Benjamin the Elephant
 The Berenstain Bears
 Bindi the Jungle Girl
 Blinky Bill
 Brambly Hedge
 The Busy World of Richard Scarry
 Captain Mack
 The Care Bears
 Connie the Cow
 Corduroy
 Chirp
 Cosy Corner
 Caillou
 Cushion Kids
 Clifford the Big Red Dog
 Dig & Dug with Daisy
 Dive Olly Dive!
 Dragon Tales
 The Doodlebops Rockin' Road Show
 Elliot Moose
 Earth To Luna
 Fraggle Rock
 Franklin
 Franklin and Friends
 Franny's Feet
 George and Martha
 GoGoRiki
 Happy Valley
 Harry and His Bucket Full of Dinosaurs (2012-2016)
 Hurray for Huckle!
 Jasper the Penguin
 Joe and Jack
 Justin Time
 Jay Jay The Jet Plane (2004-2011)
 Kipper the Dog
 Lapitch the Little Shoemaker
 Lazy Lucy
 Letters From Felix
 Little Bear
 Little Rosey
 Littlest Pet Shop
 Loopdidoo
 Lopaka
 Madeline
 Marvin the Tap-Dancing Horse
 Masha's Tales
 Meg and Mog
 Mike the Knight
 Monkey See Monkey Do
 Monster Math Squad
 Mumble Bumble
 Milly, Molly
 My Little Pony
 My Little Pony: Friendship Is Magic (2012–2022)
 Nelly and Caesar
 Noonbory and the Super Seven
 Numberjacks
 Peg + Cat
 PB Bear and Friends
 Peep and The Big Wide World (2012-2014)
 Pocket Dragon Adventures
 Postman Pat
 Rainbow Fish
 Rolie Polie Olie
 Rubbadubbers
 Rupert
 SamSam
 Scruff
 See How They Grow
 The Smurfs
 Stella and Sam
 Strawberry Shortcake
 Strawberry Shortcake's Berry Bitty Adventures
 Super Why!
 Sydney Sailboat
 Tip The Mouse
 Timothy Goes to School
 Toopy and Binoo
 Toybox
 Tractor Tom
 Transformers: Rescue Bots
 Trucktown (2016-2018)
 Vic the Viking
 The Wheels on the Bus
 Wiggly Park
 Wild Animal Baby Explorers
 Will and Dewitt
 Woolamaloo (2009)
 The Wombles (1996 series)(2005)
 Zumbers￼￼

Programming segments  
Wakey Wakey – an early morning segment which currently starts at 6am after the channel's 'through the night' back to back programming ends.
Play Time – afternoon segment 
Cuddle Time – evening programming segment which starts at 6pm. It is shown until late at night/midnight and is designed to help children get ready for bed.

Freeview
On 23 October 2014, Tiny Pop was launched on Freeview, running daily from 3 pm to 7 pm in a slot timeshared with the Community Channel. On 7 January 2015, Tiny Pop was launched fully on DTT and as from 15 March 2017, is now broadcast 24 hours a day on Freeview. Round-the-clock service continues on satellite and cable.

Prior to January 2015, the channel had broadcast billed programmes from 06:00 to 22:30, teleshopping content from 22:30 to 01:30, and a 'Through the Night' programming block from 01:30 to 06:00. From 1 January 2015, the schedule changed to run billed content from 06:00 to 00:00, with 'Through the Night' for the remaining six hours, with the teleshopping block dropped; sister channel Pop had also removed its prior teleshopping block ahead of its move onto Freeview. Sister channel Pop also showed Tiny Pop programmes until February 2015.

On 15 March 2017, Tiny Pop changed its service on Freeview, moving to the Local Television multiplexes across the UK, meaning that the channel is only available on Freeview where a local television service (e.g. Local TV Cardiff) is broadcast.

Former logos

References

External links
 

CSC Media Group
Children's television networks
Children's television channels in the United Kingdom
English-language television stations in the United Kingdom
Television channels and stations established in 2003
Television channels in the United Kingdom
Sony Pictures Television
Preschool education television networks
2003 establishments in the United Kingdom